Save Me (originally released as: Silver Convention) is the debut studio album by Silver Convention, a German Euro disco group consisting of three female vocalists (Linda G. Thompson, Penny McLean and Jackie Carter) and two producers and songwriters (Sylvester Levay and Stephan Prager).

Reception

The first track recorded for the album was "Another Girl", with an earlier track called "Save Me" also being included, even though the recording was recorded before the then-current line up of the group had been formed. The album was released in 1975, becoming a dance-floor hit. Although commercial success was mixed, the album did hit number ten on the Billboard Pop Albums chart, and number one on the Billboard Black Albums chart even though only one member of the group at the time was black.

In 2018, music critic Vince Aletti topped the album Save Me on his top ten list of albums released in 1975.

Track listing

All songs written by Sylvester Levay and Stephan Prager (Michael Kunze) unless indicated otherwise.

"Save Me" 
"I Like It" 
"Fly, Robin, Fly" 
"Tiger Baby" 
"Son of a Gun" 
"Always Another Girl" 
"Chains of Love" 
"Heart of Stone" (Levay, Prager, Gary Unwin, Keith Forsey)
"Please Don't Change the Chords of This Song"

Charts

Weekly charts

Year-end charts

Certifications and sales

See also
List of Billboard number-one R&B albums of 1975

References

External links
 Silver Convention-Save Me at Discogs

1975 debut albums
Silver Convention albums